The Vice-Chancellor of the University of Cape Town (UCT) is the executive head also referred to as the principal. The VC has the overall responsibility for the policy and administration of the University. The current Vice-Chancellor, the tenth since UCT was elevated to university status in 1918 is Mamokgethi Phakeng.

List of vice-chancellors 
 1918-1938: Sir John Carruthers Beattie
 1938-1947: AW Falconer
 1948-1955: TB Davie
 1956-1957: Reginald W. James, in an acting capacity
 1958-1967: Jacobus Duminy
 1968-1980: Sir Richard Luyt
 1981-1996: Stuart J Saunders
 1996-2000: Mamphela Ramphele
 2000-2008: Njabulo Ndebele
 2008-2018: Max Price
 2018-2023: Mamokgethi Phakeng - placed on special leave and then early retirement

See also 
Chancellor of the University of Cape Town

References 

University of Cape Town
Cape town